Maejo United Football Club (Thai: แม่โจ้ ยูไนเต็ด) is a Thai football club based in Chiang Mai, Thailand. The club is currently playing in the Thai League 3 Northern region.

Stadium and locations

Record

Players

Current squad

Personnel

Club staff

References

 http://www.supersubthailand.com/news/13559-33/index.html#sthash.KJT4upBt.dpbs
 Maejo United news
 http://www.cmskynews.com/%E0%B9%81%E0%B8%A1%E0%B9%88%E0%B9%82%E0%B8%88%E0%B9%89-%E0%B8%A2%E0%B8%B9%E0%B9%84%E0%B8%99%E0%B9%80%E0%B8%95%E0%B9%87%E0%B8%94%E0%B9%80%E0%B8%95%E0%B8%A3%E0%B8%B5%E0%B8%A2%E0%B8%A1%E0%B9%80%E0%B8%9B%E0%B8%B4%E0%B8%94%E0%B8%95%E0%B8%B1%E0%B8%A7%E0%B8%AA%E0%B9%82%E0%B8%A1%E0%B8%AA%E0%B8%A3/
 https://www.fourfourtwo.com/th/features/cchaaknkliiksuuewthiiaachiiph-10-thiimsmakhrelntngmngsuekemecchrliikpiinii

External links
 Official Facebook

 

Association football clubs established in 2016
Football clubs in Thailand
Sport in Chiang Mai
2016 establishments in Thailand